The Kumpula Campus is a science campus of University of Helsinki. The campus is located some four kilometres from the centre of Helsinki, in the Kumpula district. Completed in 2005, it currently provides study and research facilities for about 6,000 students and 1,000 teachers/researchers.

Departments of the Faculty of Science
The University of Helsinki departments housed on the campus are:
 Department of Chemistry
 Department of Computer Science
 Department of Geosciences and Geography
 Department of Mathematics and Statistics
 Department of Physics

Other institutions
A number of related or independent institutions are housed on the campus, e.g.:
 The Finnish Institute for Verification of the Chemical Weapons Convention (VERIFIN)
 The Finnish Museum of Natural History Dating Laboratory
 The Helsinki Institute of Physics (HIP)
 The Helsinki Institute for Information Technology (HIIT)
 The Institute of Seismology
 The Luma Centre
 The Finnish Meteorological Institute (FMI)
 Integrated Carbon Observation System (ICOS)

The Kumpula Science Library provides scientific library services for the campus.

Buildings 

The campus consists of the following buildings:
 Chemicum (Dept. of Chemistry; VERIFIN)
 Physicum (Depts. of Physics, Geography, and Geology; Science Library; Dating Lab.; HIP)
 Exactum (Depts. of Computer Science and Math & Statistics; I. of Seismology; HIIT)
 Dynamicum (FIMR, FMI, ICOS)
 Accelerator Laboratory
 Kumpula manor
 Sport Center

The Kumpula Botanical Garden is located adjacent to the campus.

External links
 Faculty of Science 
 Information about The Kumpula Campus 
 Kumpula Campus Library 
 The Journey Planner of Helsinki Metropolitan Public Transport Authority  — service to find a route to the campus or view the location on a map

Buildings and structures in Helsinki
University of Helsinki
Science and technology in Finland
Buildings and structures completed in 2005
Kumpula
University and college campuses in Finland